Goodenia convexa  is a species of flowering plant in the family Goodeniaceae and is endemic to Western Australia. It is a low-lying herb with egg-shaped to lance-shaped, usually toothed leaves mostly at the base of the plant, and racemes of yellow flowers.

Description

Taxonomy and naming
Goodenia convexa was first formally described in 1990 by Roger Charles Carolin in the journal Telopea from material collected by James Drummond near the Swan River.

Distribution and habitat
This goodenia grows in sandy heath and woodland between the Hill River, Tone River and Cowcowing in the south-west of Western Australia.

Conservation status
Goodenia convexa is classified as "not threatened" by the Government of Western Australia Department of Parks and Wildlife.

References

convexa
Eudicots of Western Australia
Plants described in 1990
Taxa named by Roger Charles Carolin